The Fongyi Tutorial Academy is a former tutorial academy during the Qing Dynasty rule of Taiwan in Fengshan District, Kaohsiung, Taiwan. It is the largest preserved Confucian academy in Taiwan.

History
The building was built by Jhang Ting-cing in 1814 during Jiaqing Emperor rule. It was the venue for candidates to take the imperial examination. On 13 November 1985, the building was designated as level 3 historical monument. In 2007, the Kaohsiung City Government acquired the land title of the academy and restoration to the building commenced with a total budget of NT$ 100 million.

Architecture
The building was built using traditional Chinese style with wooden carving and tablets inscribed with phrases describing good manners. It consists of 37 rooms with the center altar dedicated to Wenchang Buddha, Kuichang Buddha and Changsheng Buddha. There are stone drum on both sides of the screen wall. The garden consists of many animated statues.

Transportation
The building is accessible within walking distance east from Fongshan Station of Kaohsiung MRT.

See also
 List of tourist attractions in Taiwan
 Pingtung Tutorial Academy

References

1814 establishments in Taiwan
Academies in Taiwan
Buildings and structures in Kaohsiung
Tourist attractions in Kaohsiung